Retirement Systems of Alabama is the administrator of the pension fund for employees of the state of Alabama. It is headquartered in the state capital Montgomery, Alabama. David G. Bronner is the chief executive officer.

Under Bronner's leadership, RSA has made a number of large real estate investments, some of them highly public. Its best known development is the Robert Trent Jones Golf Trail, a chain of eleven golf course complexes throughout the state. In 2019, RSA owned 26 golf courses. Since the beginning of the 21st century, RSA has been ranked among the 20 largest internally funded pension funds in the world.

Notable investments
 Robert Trent Jones Golf Trail
 Community Newspaper Holdings (in process of being sold)
 55 Water Street, the largest office building by floor area in New York City
 Raycom Media (sold to Gray Television)
 The Grand Hotel, Point Clear, Alabama, U.S.
 RSA Battle House Tower, Mobile, Alabama, U.S.
 RSA Dexter Avenue Building, Montgomery, Alabama, U.S.
 Renaissance Ross Bridge Golf Resort and Spa, Birmingham, Alabama, U.S.
 Renaissance Montgomery Hotel & Spa at the Convention Center, Montgomery, Alabama, U.S.
 Van Antwerp Building, Mobile, Alabama, U.S.

Other properties

The building was designed by PH&J Architects and has 22 rentable floors topped by the Capital City Club on floor 23 as well as an attic and a basement. One of the tallest buildings in Montgomery, it was built by Retirement Systems of Alabama and is part of the RSA Tower Complex that includes parking garages and other buildings as well as RSA Pavilion Park. The tower's tenants include Regions Financial Corporation, Morgan Keegan & Company, NBC affiliate WSFA (channel 12), the Capital City Club, the Alabama Public Health Association, Alabama Department of Health, Alabama Department of Insurance, Alabama Artists Gallery, Bell Microproducts, and other legal, financial, and insurance firms.

According to Emporis, it was the winner of the 1998 Architectural Precast Association's Award for Design & Manufacturing Excellence.

See also
 Public employee pension plans in the United States

References

External links
 Retirement Systems of Alabama official web site

Companies based in Montgomery, Alabama
Public pension funds in the United States